Ahn Byeong-ki (born November 5, 1966 or 1967) is a South Korean film director, producer, and screenwriter specializing in horror films. His representative horror works are Phone and Bunshinsaba while his non-horror produced movies involve Scandal Makers and Sunny.

Filmography

External links
 Ahn Byeong-ki Profile from www.koreafilm.co.kr  
 안병기 at Cine 21  
 안병기 at Naver 영화 

1966 births
Living people
Horror film directors
South Korean film directors